Dum Laga Ke Haisha, released internationally as My Big Fat Bride, is a 2015 Indian Hindi-language romantic comedy-drama film written and directed by Sharat Katariya, starring Ayushmann Khurrana and Bhumi Pednekar, Sanjay Mishra and Seema Pahwa in the lead roles. The film's background score is composed by Italian composer Andrea Guerra. The film was released on 27 February 2015 to good critical reception. Box Office India stated that the film collected  domestically after a five-week run. The film celebrated 50 days of its theatrical run on 16 April 2015.

Dum Laga Ke Haisha received five nominations at the 61st Filmfare Awards, winning two, Best Female Debut for Pednekar and Best Cinematography. The song "Moh Moh Ke Dhaage" got three nominations for its lyrics by Varun Grover and vocals by Papon and Monali Thakur. The film also won the National Film Award for Best Feature Film in Hindi.

Plot
 
In 1995, Prem Prakash Tiwari is a young owner of a video cassette shop in the local market of Haridwar, who subscribes to a nationalist organisation . He daily visits its branch for their early morning ritual of recitation of the national anthem, pledge to the nation & exercise. One of the key values of the organisation is abstinence, although senior members are married & there are no restrictions on the marriage of junior members. However, it is expected that their members should not indulge in their married life at the expense of service to the nation. His father is keen on getting him married to an educated overweight girl Sandhya. In spite of not liking her, the school drop out Prem agrees to marry her as he cannot win over a girl with 'Juhi Chawla-level-of-looks.' In addition, as Sandhya is trying to be a school teacher, his family asks him to think of this alliance for financial help too. Eventually, in an elaborate community-wedding ceremony, Prem and Sandhya get married.

Prem visibly shows his disinterest in the marriage and does not consummate the marriage on the wedding night. While his sister, aunt and mother argue about his non-existent life, Prem leaves for Agra.  At home, Sandhya tries to get Prem attracted to her. But he is too embarrassed to even walk with her on the street. Prem and Sandhya's relationship remains strained although they share a kiss and have sex on their second night together. The branch manager advises him that since he could not uphold his oath of abstinence he should rather focus on his married life. Over time, Sandhya's frustration shows; when Prem's aunt brings up a petty topic, the two have a heated exchange of words and she tells them how he does not treat her well.

Amidst all this a close friend of Prem, Nirmal gets married. Prem and Sandhya go for the ceremony where due to his excessive drinking and jealousy over Nirmal's pretty wife, he tells everyone that sleeping with Sandhya feels like hell. Sandhya hears this and slaps him in front of his friends and he slaps her back. The following morning, Sandhya reflects on what she's been through, feels she has had enough and decides to leave Prem. She blames her father-in-law for his lack of respect towards women and not giving his son a proper education. Sandhya's mother tries to pacify her, saying she must return to her husband. But she decides that she can live by herself. Meanwhile, Prem decides to channel his energy into studying and to take his English paper again; he enrols for the examination. His friends give up on him; after a verbal squabble, they throw him out of the group. He studies sincerely for the exam, but at the time of his exam, he is overwhelmed by the emotional turmoil & is not able to write a word. Ultimately he plainly writes an emotional message to the person checking his paper that if at all he feels any pity for his state he should not award him with a zero or else his family would be reduced to zero (indicating his suicide attempt).

Soon, Nirmal's father opens a shop selling music CDs in the same market, clearly affecting Prem's family business. Prem's family talks to Nirmal's family and the discussion ends with Nirmal challenging him to participate and win the "Dum Lagao" contest, which entails him carrying his wife on his shoulders and running an obstacle course. Meanwhile, Sandhya and Prem reach the court to file for divorce. There, Sandhya reveals that she married him because she genuinely liked him. On the other hand, Prem bluntly says that he married her because he was under family pressure. Prem's father pleads the judge that divorce should not happen on petty issues & his family is more than happy to take her home, Sandhya's parents too feel the same & support him. The court decides that the two must spend six months with each other and try to salvage their marriage. Both decide to live together just as a formality, but they soon begin to get on, as they both start understanding each other. Meanwhile, Sandhya is coerced into the contest. Sandhya also feels that Prem should take her to the contest, but it seems that Prem is too volatile to think straight. They start coming close each passing day, but in Prem's own words they lack co-ordination & are a total mismatch.

One fine day as Prem returns home, he is disgusted to see that his family members are pretending to love culinary skills of Sandhya, which is basically boiled food devoid of spices. He finally snaps and expresses his anguish of this pretence everywhere & attempts suicide. At that same time, a police constable arrives at his home, owing to the complaint regarding his emotional letter (attempt to suicide) he had earlier written in his English exam. At this point Sandhya is moved & feels the pain of Prem, they have an open-hearted conversation & both realise that they might not be the perfect spouse for one another but care for each other deeply. Sandhya gets accepted for a teaching job in Meerut, which she gladly accepts since she feels that there is no one who cares about her anymore. When she tells Prem about it, he cannot come to terms with losing her & realises that he is in love with her.

On the day of competition, Prem's aunt successfully convinces him to participate in the competition and the couple takes a last chance to save their marriage. Surprisingly, Prem shoulders the weight of his wife and surges past all other contestants. In the last lap, Sandhya confesses to Prem that she does not want to go to Meerut and wants Prem to let her stay. Prem knows winning this competition is the only way to do this and pushes himself further to eventually win the race.

Prem does not let Sandhya get off his back even after the race is over. He takes her back all the way to his house where they seal their love with a kiss.

Cast

Production

The story of the movie is set in Haridwar and Rishikesh. Dum Laga Ke Haisha is the first Bollywood film to be entirely shot in the twin temple towns. The script of Dum Laga Ke Haisha was written in 2007, almost seven years before the release.

Bhumi Pednekar was selected for the female lead, making this her debut film. The role required the actress to be overweight As a result, she gained 30 kg to land the role.

Release
The censor board muted the word "lesbian" and replaced four words in the film. The film had a platform release in India, opening on 775 screens. The film released in UAE on 23 April 2015. As of 20 March 2015, this film has not been released in North America or Europe.

Soundtrack

Score
The film features original musical score composed by Italian composer Andrea Guerra. The composer best known for his score for The Pursuit of Happyness starring Will Smith made his debut in Bollywood with this film.

Songs

Kumar Sanu has sung two songs in the film, while Sadhana Sargam makes a comeback with this album. Other singers are Papon, Bishal Phukan, Kailash Kher, sisters Jyoti and Sultana Nooran, Malini Awasthi, Rahul Ram and Monali Thakur. Monali Thakur sang "Moh Moh Ke Dhage", for which she won the National Film Award for Best Female Playback Singer. Moh Moh ke Dhagge is arranged by Hitesh Modak

Critical reception
The Hindustan Times stated that while "You know from the onset that the guy will get his girl", the film "bucks stereotypes in many, many ways". Bollywood Hungama praised the film's lead actors Bhumi and Ayushman's performances, but criticised direction by Sharat Kataria and editing of the film. Koimoi rated . Shubhra Gupta of the Indian Express gave it . Rajeev Masand of CNN-IBN gave the film . Anuj Kumar of The Hindu praised the movie saying "Dum Laga Ke Haisha: A well-rounded effort".

Box office reception 
Dum Laga Ke Haisha's net gross was 30 crore and the film was declared as a "Hit" by the Box Office India.

Box office
Box Office India stated the film opened well, earning  in first two days in India. The film nett. grossed   on first Monday. On its first Tuesday, the film saw fall in collections as it managed to collect  of 5th day, taking the five-day total to nett.. The film nett. grossed  in 10 days. Dum Laga Ke Haisha became one of the few Hindi films, which earned more in second weekend than the first weekend. Dum Laga Ke Haisha recorded highest 5th weekend in 2015 with  nett. gross. After a five-week run, the film earned .

Awards and nominations

References

External links

Yash Raj Films films
2010s Hindi-language films
Indian romantic comedy films
Films set in Uttarakhand
Films shot in Uttarakhand
Films set in 1995
Films scored by Anu Malik
Best Hindi Feature Film National Film Award winners
2015 romantic comedy films